This is a list of countries by electricity imports mostly based on The World Factbook.

References 

Imports by country
Energy-related lists by country
Import
International trade-related lists
Lists of countries